Beaumont Island is a low, rocky island in Neny Bay, about  from the mouth of Centurion Glacier, off the west coast of Graham Land. The island was presumably first sighted in 1936 by the British Graham Land Expedition, and was roughly charted by them and by the United States Antarctic Service, 1939–41. It was surveyed in 1946 by the Falkland Islands Dependencies Survey, who named it for the Port of Beaumont, the ship of the Ronne Antarctic Research Expedition, which wintered nearby in Back Bay during 1947.

See also 
 List of Antarctic and sub-Antarctic islands

References 

Islands of Graham Land
Fallières Coast